Orontea is an opera in a prologue and three acts by the Italian composer Antonio Cesti with a libretto by Giacinto Andrea Cicognini (revised by Giovanni Filippo Apolloni).

Performance history
The first performance took place in Innsbruck on 19 February 1656. Orontea was one of the most popular Italian operas of the 17th century. It includes well-known soprano arias such as "Intorno all'idol mio", "Addio Corindo" and "Il mio ben dice ch'io speri". It was revived more than 17 times before 1700, including in Genoa, Rome, Florence, Turin, Milan, Bologna, Venice, Palermo, Naples, Hannover. Almost all of the score was lost, and the opera was forgotten. Several manuscripts were discovered in the 1950s. René Jacobs conducted a 1982 production in Innsbruck, and Ivor Bolton in 2015 at Oper Frankfurt. The work was first performed in Australia by Pinchgut Opera in 2022.

Roles

Synopsis
Prologue
Philosophy and Love argue which of them has more power over mankind.

Act 1
Queen Orontea renounces love, even though her chief adviser Creonte urges her to marry for the good of the kingdom. The young painter Alidoro arrives at the court seeking refuge from brigands with his presumed mother Aristea. He explains how he had to flee from the court of Queen Arnea of Phoenicia. In spite of vow, Orontea finds herself falling in love with Alidoro, as does the courtesan Silandra.

Act 2
Giacinta, disguised as the boy "Ismero", arrives at Orontea's court and explains she was behind the ambush of Alidoro, having been sent to kill him by the Queen of Phoenicia. Orontea can barely restrain herself from killing Giacinta with a sword. Creonte now guesses the queen is in love with Alidoro and reproaches her for choosing a commoner. Aristea falls in love with "Ismero". Meanwhile, Alidoro paints a portrait of Silandra. Orontea, mad with jealousy, bursts in during the sitting and he faints. She repents and leaves Alidoro a crown and a letter confessing her love.

Act 3
Creonte forces Orontea to reject Alidoro. He is discovered to be in possession of a royal medallion and accused of theft. Aristea explains the provenance of the trinket which proves that Alidoro is none other than Floridano, the long-lost son of the King of Phoenicia. As a child he had been kidnapped by a gang of pirates led by Aristea's husband and brought up by her as her own son. He is now free to marry Orontea.

Recordings
Orontea Helga Müller Molinari, René Jacobs, Guy de Mey, Concerto Vocale, conducted by René Jacobs (Harmonia Mundi, 1982)

Sources

The Viking Opera Guide ed. Amanda Holden (Viking, 1993)
Booklet notes to the above recording.

External links
 

Italian-language operas
Operas by Antonio Cesti
1656 operas
Operas set in ancient Egypt
Operas